John Hume was a Scottish professional footballer who played for Scottish First Division club Aberdeen as a defender.

Hume made over 300 appearances for Aberdeen before leaving in 1920 to go to Darwen in England as a coach. He later emigrated to the United States after brief spells with Arbroath and Peterhead, but eventually returned to Scotland.

In February 1913, he joined Airdrieonians for one game only, a Scottish Cup tie against St Mirren.

Career statistics

Club 
Appearances and goals by club, season and competition

References

Association football defenders
Scottish footballers
Darwen F.C. players
Peterhead F.C. players
Arbroath F.C. players
Aberdeen F.C. players
Broxburn United F.C. players
Airdrieonians F.C. (1878) players
Highland Football League players
Scottish Football League players
1885 births
1962 deaths
Footballers from Edinburgh
People from Leith
Association football coaches